HMS Merlin was a sloop of war, bearing sixteen guns, commanded by Samuel Reeve, and saw service during the American Revolutionary War.

Background

 
As part of the advance fleet of Francis Reynolds, these warships were to force the upper passage of the Delaware River, attack and silence Fort Mercer, and Fort Mifflin, during the Battle of Red Bank, which was intended to open navigation to Philadelphia, allowing the resupplying of British troops occupying that city.  Along with the HMS Augusta, it ran aground trying to avoid river obstacles while the river tide water was receding. Captain Reynolds ordered the ship destroyed to prevent its capture by the Americans in October, 1777.

Citations

Sources
 
 

American Revolutionary War
Naval battles of the American Revolutionary War
1757 ships
Ships built on the River Thames
Sloops of the Royal Navy
Maritime incidents in 1777